Rebita is a traditional music and dance that originated in Angola. It is a genre of music and dance. Couples move coordinated by the head of the wheel, performing gestures and Massemba.

Rebita Bands and Musicians

In the history of rebita music bands and musicians who made significant progress and development in the musical style, include Kiezos, Os Bongos, Super Renovacao, Africa Ritmos, Aguias Reais and Tchinina, Divicky, Paulino Pinheiro, Tony Von and Minguito.

References

See also

Music of Angola

Angolan music
World music genres
Angolan culture